The Fall of the Damned, alternately known as The Fall of the Rebel Angels is a monumental c. 1620 religious painting by Peter Paul Rubens. It features a jumble of the bodies of the damned, hurled into abyss by archangel Michael and accompanying angels. 

In 1959, an art vandal threw an acid on the painting. According to him, he did not directly destroy the work, but the acid "relieves one from the work of destruction".

Sketch

The sketch of The Fall of the Damned was made in black and red chalks, with a grey wash and is kept in the British Museum. It is assumed to be the work of a studio assistant, which Rubens then went over with brush and oil colour. The dramatic chiaroscuro of the human forms and clouds emphasizes the darkness into which these figures fall, far from the heavenly light above.

References

Paintings by Peter Paul Rubens
1620 paintings
Paintings based on the Book of Revelation
Paintings depicting Michael (archangel)
Vandalized works of art
Collection of the Alte Pinakothek
Angels in art